"Ar rannoù" ("The Series", published as "The Series, or the Druid and the Child"), also known as "Gousperoù ar raned" ("The Frogs' Vespers"), is a traditional Breton folksong, composed in twelve parts or "series".

Origin and significance of the song 

The real origin of the song remains unknown.

Théodore Hersart de La Villemarqué collected this song in Cornouaille, Brittany, and published it in Barzaz Breiz, making it the opening piece of his work.  For him the origin of the song stretches back to the time of the Druids and is a testimony of the past, treating of Breton mythology, the composition of the world, life and battles.

For others, including François-Marie Luzel who collected around twenty different versions in Cornouaille and Trégor (Gousperoù ar raned), it is only a rimadell, intended to exercise the memory.  Luzel rejected La Villemarqué's version, which he declared erroneous because overinterpreted as to the mythological aspect.  However, some variants collected by Luzel have elements very close to the version of de La Villemarqué.

In both cases, the real meaning of the lyrics remains surrounded by a certain mystery, the people from whom these songs are collected themselves admitting their ignorance of the real meaning of the lyrics.

Manner of singing 

The song is a dialogue between a child and a teacher (a druid for de La Villemarqué).  The teacher asks the child what he wants to know, at which the child asks him for the first strophe (a "series" for de La Villemarqué).  The teacher sings the first strophe, then again asks the question.  The child then asks for the second strophe.  The teacher sings the second strophe and repeats the first one.  Then the child asks for the third strophe, and so on.  The song carries on with these repetitions of the previous stanzas already sung, until the twelfth stanza is sung.

Comparison of the translated lyrics

References

External links 

 Bibliographical details at the Bibliothèque nationale de France  (in French)
 More bibliographical details at the Bibliothèque nationale de France  (in French)

Breton mythology and folklore
Breton folk songs
Cumulative songs
Songwriter unknown
Year of song unknown